Edward Douglass (September 17, 1887 – death unknown) was an American Negro league first baseman and manager between 1918 and 1925.

A native of Fort Worth, Texas, Douglass made his Negro league debut for the Brooklyn Royal Giants in 1918. He was named player-manager in 1921, and continued in that capacity with Brooklyn through 1925. Douglass also played one season (1923–24) in the Cuban League for the Leopardos de Santa Clara.

References

External links
 and Baseball-Reference Black Baseball stats and Seamheads
 

1887 births
Year of death missing
Place of death missing
Negro league baseball managers
Brooklyn Royal Giants players
Leopardos de Santa Clara players
American expatriate baseball players in Cuba
Baseball infielders